Arthropodology (from Greek  - arthron, "joint", and , gen.:  - pous, podos, "foot", which together mean "jointed feet") is a biological discipline concerned with the study of arthropods, a phylum of animals that include the insects, arachnids, crustaceans and others that are characterized by the possession of jointed limbs.

This field is very important in medicine, studied together with parasitology. Medical arthropodology is the study of the parasitic effect of arthropods, not only as parasites but also as vectors. The first annual  Conference on Medical Arthropodology was held in Madurai (Tamil Nadu) in 2007.

Subfields
Subfields of arthropodology are
Arachnology - the study of spiders and other arachnids
Entomology - the study of insects (until the 19th century this term was used for the study of all arthropods)
Carcinology - the study of crustaceans
Myriapodology - the study of centipedes, millipedes, and other myriapods

Journals
 Journal of Arthropodology

References

Bibliography
 Vargas, V M. 1976. Notas sobre Artropodología Médica. Oficina de Publicaciones Universidad de Costa Rica.

External links
Institute of Arthropodology and Parasitology

 
Subfields of zoology